The  (Spanish Cup of American Football) is an annual cup competition for Spanish gridiron teams. Founded in 1995, it is the second most important gridiron competition in Spain, after the league.

History

Results by team

External links
Copa de España official website

 
Recurring sporting events established in 1995
1995 establishments in Spain